There are around 117 villages in Nagar tehsil of Ahmednagar district of state of Maharashtra. Following is Balewaditehsil.

A
 Agadgaon
 Ahvadwadi
 Akolner
 Ambilwadi
 Arangaon
 Athawad
 Akole

B
 
 
 Balewadi
 Barababhali
 Baradari
 Belapur
 Bhatodi (pargaon)
 Bhorwadi
 Bhoyare Kh
 Bhoyare Pathar
 Burhanagar
 nagar
Burudgaon

C
 Chas
 Chichondi Patil

D
 Dahigaon
 Darewadi
 Dashamigavan
Dehare
 Deogaon
 Deulgaon Siddhi
 Dhangarwadi
 Dongargan

G
 Ghospuri
 Gunawadi
 Gundegaon

H
 Hamidpur
 Hatwalan
 Hingangaon
Hiwarebazar
 Hiwarezare

I
 Imampur
 Islak

J
 Jakhangaon
 Jeur

K
 Kamargaon
 Kaparewadi
 Karjune Khare
 Khadaki
 Khandake
 Khandala
 Khatgaon Takali
 Khospuri
 Kolhewadi
 Koudgaon
 Kedgaon (Deviche)

M
 Madadgaon
 Majalechincholi
 Mandave
 Manjarsumba
 Mathani
 Mathapimpri
 Mehekari

N
 Nagardeole
 Nandgaon
 Narayandoho
 Nepti
 Nimblak
 Nimbodi
 Nimgaon Ghana
 Nimgaon Wagha

P
 Pangarmal
 Parewadi
 Pargaon (bhatodi)
 Pargaon Moula
 Pimpalgaon Landaga
 Pimpalgaon Kouda
 Pimpalgaon Malvi
 Pimpalgaon Ujjaini
 Pimpalgaon Wagha
 Pokhardi

R
 Ralegan

Ranjani

 Ratadgaon
 Ruichhattisi

S
 Sakat Kh
 Sandave
 Sarola Baddi
 Sarola Kasar
 Sasewadi
 Shahapur/kekati
 Shendi
 Shingave
 Shiradhon
 Sonewadi
 Sonewadi P
 Savedi

T
 Takali Kazi
 Takali Khatgaon
 Tandali Wadgaon
 Teesgoan

U
 Udarmal
 Ukkadgaon

V
 Vilad

W
 Wadarwadi
 Wadgaon Gupta
 Wadgaon Tandali
 Wakodi
 Walaki
 Walunj
 Warulwadi
 Watephal

See also
 Nagar tehsil
 Tehsils in Ahmednagar
 Villages in Akole tehsil
 Villages in Jamkhed tehsil
 Villages in Karjat tehsil
 Villages in Kopargaon tehsil
 Villages in Nevasa tehsil
 Villages in Parner tehsil
 Villages in Pathardi tehsil
 Villages in Rahata tehsil
 Villages in Rahuri tehsil
 Villages in Sangamner tehsil
 Villages in Shevgaon tehsil
 Villages in Shrigonda tehsil
 Villages in Shrirampur tehsil

References

 
Nagar